Magliano Alpi is a comune (municipality) in the Province of Cuneo in the Italian region Piedmont, located about  south of Turin and about  northeast of Cuneo.

Magliano Alpi borders the following municipalities: Bene Vagienna, Carrù, Frabosa Soprana, Frabosa Sottana, Mondovì, Ormea, Rocca de' Baldi, Roccaforte Mondovì, Sant'Albano Stura, and Trinità.

Demographic evolution

Twin towns — sister cities
Magliano Alpi is twinned with:

  Etruria, Córdoba, Argentina (2008)

References

Cities and towns in Piedmont